is a Japanese former football player.

Honours

Club
Nõmme Kalju
Meistriliiga (1): 2012
Runner-up (2): 2011, 2013
 Factor Ljubljana
Slovenian Second League (1): 2005–06
 Gorica
Slovenian PrvaLiga Runner-up (1): 2008–09
 Minsk
Belarusian Premier League 3rd (1): 2010

Individual

Nõmme Kalju

Meistriliiga Best Eleven of the Year (2) : 2011, 2012
Meistriliiga Best Midfielder of the Year (2) : 2011, 2012
Meistriliiga Best Player of the Year Runner-up (2) : 2011, 2012
Meistriliiga Best Player of the Month (3) : August 2011, June 2012, March 2013
2011 Meistriliiga Best Eleven of the Month (5) : March 2011, April 2011, June 2011, August 2011, September 2011
Meistriliiga Best Transfer Runner-up (1) : 2011

Club statistics

(C) = Champion; (R) = Relegated; (P) = Promoted

References

External links
  
 
 
 

1983 births
Living people
Association football people from Tochigi Prefecture
Japanese footballers
Association football midfielders
Japanese expatriate footballers
Expatriate footballers in Singapore
Expatriate footballers in Slovenia
Expatriate footballers in Austria
Expatriate footballers in the Czech Republic
Expatriate footballers in Belarus
Expatriate footballers in Estonia
Expatriate footballers in Finland
J2 League players
Czech First League players
Singapore Premier League players
Esiliiga players
Meistriliiga players
Albirex Niigata players
Albirex Niigata Singapore FC players
NK IB 1975 Ljubljana players
SV Bad Aussee players
ND Gorica players
FK Bohemians Prague (Střížkov) players
FC Minsk players
Nõmme Kalju FC players
JK Tallinna Kalev players
FC Lahti players
IF Gnistan players
Japanese expatriate sportspeople in Austria
Japanese expatriate sportspeople in the Czech Republic
Japanese expatriate sportspeople in Belarus
Japanese expatriate sportspeople in Estonia
Japanese expatriate sportspeople in Singapore
Japanese expatriate sportspeople in Finland
Japanese expatriate sportspeople in Slovenia